Each national team had to present a list of twenty players by 2 March 2011, but each association had the ability to change five players up to five days before the start of the tournament. All the players had to be born after 1 January 1994.

Players name marked in bold have been capped at full international level.

Argentina
Manager: Oscar Garré

Bolivia
Manager: Douglas Cuenca

Brazil
Manager: Émerson Ávila

Chile
Manager: George Biehl

Colombia
Manager: Ramiro Viafara

Ecuador
Manager: Javier Rodríguez

Paraguay
Manager: Gerardo González Aquino

Peru
Manager: Juan José Oré

Uruguay
Manager: Fabián Coito

Venezuela
Manager: Marcos Mathías

References

External links
Official list of players

South American Under-17 Football Championship squads